The 17th New York Veteran Infantry Regiment was an infantry regiment that served in the United States Army during the American Civil War. It was often referred to as the 17th New York Veteran Zouaves and has been erroneously reported as using mules as mounts during Sherman's March to the Sea up until the Grand Review of the Armies.  The regiment wore the Hawkins Zouave pattern uniform, which was first used by the 9th New York Volunteer Infantry, Hawkins Zouaves, and later was adopted by several other regiments including the 164th New York, 35th New Jersey and others.

Military service, October 1863 to April 1865
The regiment was organized in New York City, New York, from June to October 1863, with elements of the 9th (Hawkins' Zouaves), 11th (First Fire Zouaves), 17th, & 38th New York Volunteer Infantry Regiments. The Regiment was mustered into United States service on October 18, 1863, in New York City for three years service with 900 officers and men under the command of Colonel William Thomas Campbell Grower, formerly the major of the 17th New York Volunteer Infantry Regiment.

When they left the State, they were composed almost wholly of veteran volunteers. Ordered to the Department of the Southwest under Major General Andrew Jackson Smith, they would later join the army of Major General William T. Sherman, and serve under him throughout the remainder of the war.

In December 1863, under General Andrew J. Smith, the regiment took part in the Tennessee Campaign chasing Confederate Major General Nathan B. Forrest's Cavalry command. Joining Major General William T. Sherman's forces at Vicksburg, Mississippi, in January 1864, the regiment took part in the Meridian Campaign from Vicksburg to Meridian, Mississippi, marching over 460 miles. In April they moved to Decatur, Alabama, where they were engaged in skirmishing with the Confederate forces under Brigadier General Philip D. Roddy, attacking them at Pond Spring, Courtland, etc., and routing them and capturing the whole of their camp. Joining the Army in the operations against Atlanta, Georgia, they took part in the fighting and siege against Atlanta with the 14th Army Corps. On September 1st, 1864, at the Battle of Jonesboro they charged and fought against Confederate Major General Patrick R. Cleburne's Division, who boasted to never have been defeated, but who were then broken, routed, and had their works taken from them. It was there that Colonel William T.C. Grower was mortally wounded (dying several days later) and over 150 men left on the field as casualties. From Atlanta they pursued the Confederate Army of Tennessee, under General John Bell Hood, westward, marching over 600 miles back into Tennessee and Alabama. Returning to Atlanta they started the next morning on the March to the Sea from Atlanta to Savannah. Following the fall of Savannah, the regiment rested around Savannah before crossing into South Carolina with the Army. In the Carolina's Campaign they marched through South Carolina into North Carolina, being engaged at Averysboro, North Carolina, where Lieutenant Colonel James Lake was severely wounded. A few days later they took part in their last major engagement at Bentonville, North Carolina, where, despite being completely surrounded, it held off several attacks.

Following the surrender of the Confederate Forces under General Joseph E. Johnston on April 26th, 1865, at Durham Station, North Carolina, the regiment took part in the rapid march through Richmond, Virginia, and onto Washington, D.C. Camping at Alexandria, Virginia, they took part in the Grand Review of the Army later that month, and were soon thereafter mustered out of service. General William Vandever said of the regiment, "...In all the essential qualities which distinguish the heroic citizen soldier, the Seventeenth New York has been excelled by none." While General Jefferson C. Davis wrote, "...its soldierly conduct, attention to duty, and invariably gallant conduct in action, has reflected credit upon itself and the corps."

Military service, 1865
The regiment was mustered out of service on June 13, 1865, at Alexandria, Virginia, under the command of Lieutenant Colonel James Lake, with less than 200 officers and men.

Casualties
The regiment suffered the following casualties during its service.
 Killed in action: 1 officer, 38 enlisted
 Died of wounds: 1 officer, 16 enlisted
 Died of disease and other causes: 65 enlisted (2 died as POW's)
 Wounded but recovered: 6 officers, 111 enlisted
 Captured or missing: 1 officer, 39 enlisted
 Total: 213 casualties

Commanding officers
 Colonel William Thomas Campbell Grower
 Lieutenant Colonel Edward Jardine
 Lieutenant Colonel James Lake
 Lieutenant Colonel Joel O. Martin
 Major Charles Hilbert
 Major James B. Horner
 Major Alexander S. Marshall

See also

List of New York Civil War regiments
New York State Military Museum and Veterans Research Center – Civil War – 17th Veteran Infantry Regiment History, photographs, historical sketch, table of battles and casualties, and Civil War newspaper clippings, for the 17th New York Veteran Volunteer Infantry Regiment.
Palmetto Riflemen & New York Zouaves American Civil War Living History / Reenactor Group that portrays Company H of the 17th New York Veteran Volunteer Infantry Regiment.

References

 Graham, Matthew J.; "The Ninth Regiment New York Volunteers (Hawkins' Zouaves). Being a History of the Regiment and Veteran Association from 1860 to 1900." New York: E.P. Coby & Co., printers, 1900.
 Phisterer, Frederick; “New York in the War of the Rebellion.” 3rd Edition, Albany, New York, J.B. Lyon Company, 1912.
 Westervelt, William B.; "Lights and Shadows of Army Life, as seen by a private soldier, by Wm. B. Westervelt of the 27th N.Y. Infantry and 17th N.Y. Veteran Zouaves." C.H. Cochrane Printer, Marlboro, New York, 1886.
 Pages 821 to 958, “Annual Report of the Adjutant General of the State of New York. For the Year 1899.” James B. Lyon State Printers, Albany, New York, 1900.
 Volume II, "The Union Army: A History of Military Affairs in the loyal States, 1861–1865. Records of the Regiments in the Union Army, Cyclopedia of Battles, Memoirs of Commanders and Soldiers.” Federal Publishing Company, Madison, Wisconsin, 1908.
 Pages 388 to 407, Volume VI, “A Record of the Commissioned Officers, Non Commissioned Officers and Privates, of the Regiments which were organized in the State of New York, and called into the service of the United States to Assist in Suppressing the Rebellion caused by the secession of some of the Southern States from the Union, A.D. 1861, as taken from the Muster-In Rolls on File in the Adjutant Generals Office, S.N.Y.” Weed, Parsons, and Company, Printers, Albany, New York, 1866.
 Page 452, “Official Army Register of the Volunteer force of the United States Army for the years 1861, ’62, ’63, ’64, ’65.” Adjutant Generals Office, United States Army, 1865 to 1867.

Infantry 017
1863 establishments in New York (state)
Military units and formations established in 1863
Military units and formations disestablished in 1865